Helju is an Estonian feminine given name.

As of 1 January 2021, 1,282 women in Estonia have the first name Helju, making it the 141st most popular female name in the country. The average age of people bearing the name Helju is 78 years old, with a median age of 79. The name is most commonly found in Võru County, where 21.78 per 10,000 inhabitants of the county bear the name.   

Individuals bearing the name Helju include:

Helju Mikkel (1925–2017), Estonian folk dancer and choreographer
Helju Rammo (1926–1998), Estonian children's writer and playwright
Helju Rebane (born 1948), Estonian prose writer
Helju Vals (1929–2011), Estonian editor and journalist

References

Feminine given names
Estonian feminine given names